Chrysodeixis minutus is a moth of the family Noctuidae. It is found in Assam, Japan, China and Taiwan.

References

Moths described in 1970
Plusiinae
Moths of Japan